Are You Dead Yet? is the fifth studio album by Finnish melodic death metal band Children of Bodom. It was released in Finland on 14 September 2005 and internationally on 25 October 2005 under the Century Media label. It is the first Children of Bodom album to feature guitarist Roope Latvala (Stone, Sinergy, ex-Waltari), due to the departure of their original rhythm guitarist Alexander Kuoppala. In this album, the band used the drop C tuning, whereas they usually used D standard. The power metal influences previously prominent are also greatly reduced in this album, resulting in a more simplistic performance and slower tempos. The keyboards also were dropped lower in the mix, with the guitars maintaining musical dominance.

Background
Are You Dead Yet? is the second Children of Bodom album to have two singles from it. "Trashed, Lost & Strungout" was released as an EP and single in 2004, and "In Your Face" was released in August 2005 shortly before the album. It was also their first album with three music videos, with their third video being the title track.

"If You Want Peace... Prepare for War" is the English translation of the Latin phrase Si vis pacem, para bellum and the song "Are You Dead Yet?" is a downloadable song in the music video game Rock Band 2, and it can also be played in some of the other Rock Band games.

The title track's video was shot in part at the Tavastia club in Helsinki, Finland on 13 February 2006. Additional footage for the video was filmed in the US. The clip received its premiere in the US on MTV's Headbangers Ball on 18 March 2006 wherein the band made a special appearance. The video for "Are You Dead Yet?" was directed by Ralf Strathmann and involves a rather controversial intimate make out scene that is bit graphic in nature for the actors who were minors at the time. Ashley Matthews (Riley Reid), better known as an American pornographic actress was just fourteen years old when she portrayed a prostitute. And actor Cohlie Brocato was only sixteen years old portraying the male counterpart portrayed in the video, all casting by Ralf Strathmann.

Name
The name of the album and its title track was conceived by Alexi Laiho after an alcohol-related injury. He alludes to this during the band's concert DVD, Chaos Ridden Years, and in a magazine article, says: 
"I came up with the new album title last winter when we were back home and I went out for a night of drinking. I got a hold of some of the cheapest vodka and just drank and drank and drank, and one thing led to another, so we were outside having fun, and I climbed on top of a car, and slipped and fell off, and next thing I know I was in hospital. I had three broken bones in my wrist and lots of stitches, got kept in over night. So when I woke up the next morning I obviously wasn't feeling too good. I looked in the mirror and said to myself, 'Have you had enough? Are you dead yet?'"

Reception

In 2005, Are You Dead Yet? was ranked number 485 in Rock Hard magazine's book of The 500 Greatest Rock & Metal Albums of All Time. However, it was criticized by Paul Stenning in Terrorizer as "interminably weak" and destructive of the band's "remaining credibility".

Track listing

Personnel

Children Of Bodom
Alexi Laiho – lead guitar, lead vocals
Roope Latvala – rhythm guitar, solos on "If You Want Peace... Prepare For War", backing vocals
Henkka Seppälä – bass, backing vocals
Janne Wirman – keyboards
Jaska Raatikainen – drums

Additional musicians
Alexander Kuoppala – rhythm guitar on "Somebody Put Something in My Drink"
Jonna Kosonen – female vocals on "Oops!...... I Did It Again"

Production
Produced, recorded, and mixed by Mikko Karmila, except "Trashed, Lost & Strungout", produced and recorded by Anssi Kippo and mixed by Karmila
Mastered by Mika "Count" Jussila
Cover artwork by Sami Saramäki
Band photographs by Toni Härkönen

Charts

References

2005 albums
Children of Bodom albums
Century Media Records albums
Spinefarm Records albums